Maisnam Amubi Singh was an exponent of the Indian classical dance form of Manipuri, and the founding supervisor of the Jawaharlal Nehru Manipuri Dance Academy. Singh, who was credited with pioneering solo dance in Manipuri, was the first winner of Sangeet Natak Akademi award from the state of Manipur which he won in 1956. He was honoured by the Government of India in 1970 with Padma Shri, the fourth highest Indian civilian award.

See also

 Manipuri dance

References

Recipients of the Padma Shri in arts
Recipients of the Sangeet Natak Akademi Award
Dancers from Manipur
Year of birth missing
Year of death missing
Performers of Indian classical dance
Manipuri classical Indian dance exponents
20th-century Indian dancers
Indian male dancers